Rock the Wake was an extreme sports and music festival, which specialized on water sports, hosted in Canada. It took place in the cottage country region of Haliburton, Ontario. The event brought in more than 200 competitors, hundreds of musicians, and thousands of spectators from North America over three days.

Highlights
2006 & 2007 Ontario Wakeboarding Championships
Pro Wakeboading with world pro riders including both Parks and Shane Bonifay
Pro Wakeskate rail and winch contests with massive slider pool setups
Pro BMX & Inline skate team demonstrations including a full freestyle setup
Concert series featuring over 50 bands
Free Style MX that featured the 2005 & 2007 Canadian Suzuki Pro Team
Retail boarder village

Sponsors
Mastercraft Boats, Coors Light, Maple Lodge Farms, Quiksilver, Roxy, Buckeye Marine, Liquid Force Wakeboards, Sony PlayStation, Levi's, Gillette, Bombardier, Dragon Optical, VW, Rogers Wireless, Beaver Buzz Energy.

Music
Bands that performed at the concert series include:

The Salads
Alterspective (now Mindsight)
The Waking Eyes
Amped
Acoustic Truth
Hero's Day Off
88
dodger
Angel and I
Thirty Six D
Out of Options
Hell or High Water
Melvatoast
One Second Too Late
Mundane Redemption
Privacy Statement
Inadequate Rumor
Tequila Mockingbird
Thryvn
Kindred
Starstruck Hero

Sports competitions in Canada
Rock festivals in Canada
Music festivals in Ontario
Recurring events established in 2006